Adel Mahamoud (born 4 March 2003) is a professional footballer who plays as a forward for Nantes B. Born in France, he plays for the Comoros national team.

Career
Mahamoud is a youth product of Viry-Châtillon and Nantes. He was promoted to Nantes reserves in 2021 in the Championnat National 2.

International career
Born in France, Mahamoud is Comorian descent. He represented the Comoros U20 at the 2022 Maurice Revello Tournament. He was called up to the senior Comoros national team for a set of friendlies in September 2022. He made his debut with Comoros as a late substitute in a 1–0 friendly loss to Tunisia on 22 September 2022.

References

External links
 

2003 births
Living people
Footballers from Nantes
Comorian footballers
Comoros international footballers
Comoros under-20 international footballers
French footballers
French sportspeople of Comorian descent
Association football forwards
Championnat National 2 players
FC Nantes players